Judge for a Day is a 1935 Fleischer Studios animated short film starring Betty Boop.

Synopsis
Betty is the stenographer at the local courthouse. On the bus ride to work one day, she grows tired of the obnoxious actions of some of her fellow citizens (which she refers to as "pests"), and fantasizes about what she'd do if she were the judge. Among her decrees: a thoughtless smoker learns about second-hand smoke the hard way, and an obnoxious celebrity impersonator is rewarded by having his ears blasted with imitations of Tarzan and the Shadow.

The townsfolk overhear her complaints and vocalize their agreement, leading to Betty being elected as judge with full support from the town.

References

External links
 Judge for a Day at the Big Cartoon Database.
 Judge for a Day on YouTube.
 

1935 short films
Betty Boop cartoons
1930s American animated films
American black-and-white films
1935 animated films
Paramount Pictures short films
Fleischer Studios short films
Short films directed by Dave Fleischer
1930s English-language films
American animated short films
American comedy short films